Simon Gauzy (born 25 October 1994) is a French table tennis player. He competed at the 2016 Summer Olympics in the men's singles event, in which he was eliminated in the third round by Kou Lei, and as part of the French team in the men's team event.

References

External links

Simon Gauzy at Table Tennis Media

1994 births
Living people
French male table tennis players
Olympic table tennis players of France
Table tennis players at the 2016 Summer Olympics
Table tennis players at the 2010 Summer Youth Olympics
European Games medalists in table tennis
Table tennis players at the 2015 European Games
European Games silver medalists for France
Table tennis players at the 2019 European Games
Sportspeople from Toulouse
Table tennis players at the 2020 Summer Olympics
21st-century French people